T10 may refer to:

Aircraft 
 AmeriPlanes Mitchell Wing T-10, an American ultralight aircraft
 Auster T.10, a British observation aircraft
 Carmier Dupoy T.10, a French sport plane
 Sukhoi T-10, a Soviet prototype jet fighter

Anatomy 
 Tenth thoracic vertebra
 Thoracic spinal nerve 10

Automobiles 
 Suzuki T10, a motorcycle
 Toyota Corona (T10), a sedan
 Triumph T10, a scooter

Rail and transit

Lines 
 Île-de-France tramway Line 10, France
 T10 line, of the Stockholm Metro

Rolling stock 
 Prussian T 10, a Prussian steam locomotive
 T-10, a former Federal Railroad Administration track geometry car based on the Budd SPV-2000

Stations 
 Bus Center-Mae Station, Sapporo, Hokkaido, Japan
 Higashiyama Station (Kyoto), Japan
 Hiketa Station, Higashikagawa, Kagawa Prefecture, Japan
 Nihombashi Station, Tokyo, Japan
 Tsurumai Station, Nagoya, Aichi Prefecture, Japan

Sports 
 Abu Dhabi T10, a 10-over cricket league
 T10 cricket, a 90-minute format of cricket

Other uses 
 T10 (satellite)
 Estonian national road 10
 
 Samsung T10, a portable media player
 Soyuz T-10, a crewed Soyuz mission
 T-10 bomb, an American earthquake bomb
 T-10 parachute, used by the United States Army
 T-10 tank, a Soviet heavy tank
 Toogee language
 T10, on the TORRO scale of tornado intensity
 T10, a fluorescent-lamp format